Network Virtualization using Generic Routing Encapsulation (NVGRE) is a network virtualization technology  that attempts to alleviate the scalability problems associated with large cloud computing deployments. It uses Generic Routing Encapsulation (GRE) to tunnel layer 2 packets over layer 3 networks.
Its principal backer is Microsoft.

See also 

 Virtual Extensible LAN (VXLAN), a similar competing specification
 Generic Networking Virtualization Encapsulation (GENEVE), an industry effort to unify both VXLAN and NVGRE technologies
 Generic Routing Encapsulation, GRE for transporting L3 packets.

References

External links 
 NVGRE Overview, November 19, 2012, by Joe Onisick

Tunneling protocols